The 1965 South Africa rugby union tour of Australasia was a long series of matches played in 1965 by South Africa national rugby union team in Australia and New Zealand.
It was not a successful tour. The Springboks lost both test matches against Australia and three of their four matches with All Blacks.


Matches in Australia
Scores and results list South Africa's points tally first.

Matches in New Zealand
Scores and results list South Africa's points tally first.

South Africa national rugby team tours of Australia
Springbok tour
South Africa national rugby team tours of New Zealand
tour
1965 in New Zealand rugby union
1965 in South African rugby union
Sports scandals in Australia
Sports scandals in New Zealand
Rugby union and apartheid